Frederik Vilhelm August Meinert (1833, in Copenhagen – 1912), was a Danish arachnologist and editor of the first series of Entomologiske Meddelelser.

Meinert initially studied theology . Later he was a  pupil of  Jørgen Matthias Christian Schiødte and he too became Inspektor at the Zoological Museum in Copenhagen. Meinert specialised in comparative anatotomy and histology mainly of Malacostraca and Pycnogonida .

Works
Symbolæ ad monographiam Cymotharum Crustaceorum Isopodum familiæ (1879) with Schiødte
Fluernes munddele trophi dipterorumKjobenhavn: H. Hagerups boghandel (1881).
Crustacea malacostraca. Det Videnskabelige Udbytte af Kanonbaaden "Hauchs" Togter 3: 147–230 (1890)
 Pycnogonida: af Fr. Meinert. Bianco Luno (1899)

Species named for him are Clypeoniscus meinerti Giard & Bonnier, 1895, Laothoes meinerti Boeck, 1871, Paralaophonte meinerti(Brady, 1899) and Neosarmatium meinerti(De Man).

References
Anonym, 1913  Entomologist's Monthly Magazine (2), London 14 (39) : 153, 175
Howard, L. O., 1930 History of applied Entomology (Somewhat Anecdotal). Smiths. Miscell. Coll., Washington

External links
DEI
ZMUC Old museum

Danish entomologists
Danish zoologists
1833 births
1912 deaths